Zhonghu Township is a township under the administration of Wulingyuan District, Zhangjiajie in Hunan province, China. , it administers the following residential neighborhoods and villages:
Neighborhoods
Yangjiajie
Yejipu

Villages
Shijiayu Village
Tanmugang Village
Sanjiayu Village
Yuquanyu Village
Qinglongya Village
Dingjiazhuang Village

References 

Townships of Hunan
Zhangjiajie